The Vortech Shadow is an American autogyro that was designed by Tyler Flight, Inc. and produced by Vortech of Fallston, Maryland. The aircraft is supplied as a kit and also in the form of plans for amateur construction. Vortech also supplies rotor blades for the design.

Design and development
The Vortech Shadow was designed to comply with the US Experimental - Amateur-built aircraft rules. It features a single main rotor, a two-seats-in side-by-side configuration enclosed cockpit with a windshield, tricycle landing gear, plus a tail caster. The standard engine used is the four cylinder, air-cooled, four-stroke, dual-ignition  Lycoming O-320 powerplant in pusher configuration.

The aircraft fuselage is made from tubing and composites.

The manufacturer estimates the construction time from the supplied kit as 250 hours.

Operational history
By 1998 the company reported that four kits had been sold and were completed and flying.

In January 2015 no examples were registered in the United States with the Federal Aviation Administration.

Specifications (Shadow)

See also
List of rotorcraft

References

External links

Shadow
1990s United States sport aircraft
1990s United States civil utility aircraft
Homebuilt aircraft
Single-engined pusher autogyros